The following is a list of South Korean films that were released in theaters in 2018.

Box office
The highest-grossing South Korean films released in 2018, by domestic box office gross revenue, are as follows:

Released

References

External links

South Korean
2018
2018 in South Korean cinema